The Stade Municipal de Gabès is a multi-use stadium in Gabès, Tunisia.  It is currently used mostly for football matches and is the home ground of Stade Gabèsien and AS Gabès of the Tunisian Ligue Professionnelle 1.  The stadium has a capacity of 15,000 spectators.

References

External links
 Stadium information

Football venues in Tunisia